Gustavo Carulli (15 June 1801 – 27 October 1876), called Gustave Carulli in French publications, was a composer, musician (pianist, singer, guitarist) and music teacher.

Life
Born at Livorno, he was the son of guitarist, singer and composer Ferdinando Carulli and the French Marie-Josephine Boyer. Gustavo learned the guitar and singing from his father, Ferdinando who, besides his well-known guitar works (such as his Méthode complette pour guitarre, op. 27, composed expressly for the instruction of his son), also published and arranged works for singers

 and even a method of singing and accompaniment of singing
.

Young Gustavo went to Paris with his father, where he studied piano under the polish Mirecki, harmony with Nicolo Isouard and composition with Ferdinando Paer.

In 1825 his opera I tre mariti was performed in La Scala in Milan.

In 1838 Gustavo Carulli published his Méthode de chant dedicated to Gilbert Duprez. Numerous of the teaching methods therein, were incorporated into Solfège des solfèges where he collaborated with Henri Lemoine; later Adolphe-Léopold Danhauser augmented Solfège des solfèges with additional lessons.

Carulli is said to also have been fluent in an earlier style "the galant phraseology of the 1780s".

He gave singing classes in his dwelling Rue de Provence 63 bis., living only 2 numbers away from Franz Liszt.

In 1847, two of Gustavo Carulli's songs were awarded prices in a Concours des chants populaires.

Later he moved to Boulogne-sur-Mer, where he remained and died. There one of his students was Alexandre Guilmant whom he taught harmony, counterpoint and fugue.

Works
See External links below, for works referenced in catalogues.

 Methode pour la guitare, Op. 4
 Quadrille, sur les motifs de L'Opera La Semiramide (Musique de G. Rossini, Arrangee pour le Piano-Forte, par Gustave Carulli)
 Quadrilles, from the Opera of "La Gazza Ladra" by Rossini, arranged for the piano-forte by Gustave Carulli
 Six Sonatines très-faciles pour le Pianoforte, composée par G. Carulli. Leipzig, Hofmeister
 Tre cantibile per piano-forte 
 Repertorio per gli allievi, ossia raccolta di diversi motivi del celebre M Mayer
 Pot-pourri per Pian-forte e Violino estratt della Semiramide 
 "Paganini" Trois airs variés pour le Violon, pour étre executes sur la quatrieme corde seulement, avec accompagnement de Piano, par Gustave Carulli
 Rondo brilliant, précédé d'un andante pour le piano
 Méthode du Chant, dediée à Duprez par G. Carulli, professeur du Chant
 Quinze vocalises a deux voix, faisant suite a la Methode
 Solfège des solfèges
 Les Feux Follets, Album de Chant avec accompagnement de Piano, pour 1842, Paroles de MM. Ancouet et E. Barateau, Musique de Gustave Carulli, contenant cinq Romances et cinq nocturnes
 Album de 1839; Paroles de Mme Tastu, MM. Aucoult et Barateau, Musique de Gustave Carulli 
 Mélodies, pour trois voix égales 
 Melodies referenced in Catalogue général des livres, ouvrages périodiques, journaux et morceaux de musique de la Bibliothèque Catholique de Termonde
 Etoile chérie, romance, musique de Gustave Carulli, paroles de Emile Barateau
 O mon Dieu, si ton bon plaisir, paroles de Corneille
 Pour qui rêve d'Amour, paroles de Barateau
 Si vous ne m'aimez plus! musique de G. Carulli, paroles de Em. Barateau
 Marie "Charle est a moi" 
 Huit melodies pour trois voix egales, paroles de M. Alph. de Lamartine et autres auteurs
 Ding-Dong
 Tre canzonette, paroli di diversi autori, con accompagnamento di piano-forte
 G. Carulli: Leichte und gefällige Singübungen in Arien, Romanzen und Duetten von Donizetti, Bellini, Rossini u.s.w.

References

External links
 Biography
 Biographie universelle des musiciens et bibliographie; Suppl. v.1. Fétis, François-Joseph
 Biographie universelle des musiciens et bibliographie générale de la musique
 Cyclopedia of music and musicians. Ed. by John Denison
 I maestri di musica italiani del secolo xix: notizie biografiche, by Giovanni Masutto
 The guitar and mandolin : biographies of celebrated players and composers for these instruments by Bone, Philip James
 ‘Il faut savoir l’Italien pour déchiffrer une romance française’: Italian Presence in the French Romance 1800 – 1850 by Helen Louise Macfarlane Thesis, Referencing Gustavo Carulli

 Works referenced in catalogues
 WorldCat
 Internet Culturale (Italy)
 Bibliothèque nationale de France (alternative)

1801 births
1876 deaths
19th-century Italian male singers
Italian classical composers
Italian male classical composers
19th-century classical composers
Italian Romantic composers
Italian classical guitarists
Italian male guitarists
Composers for the classical guitar
19th-century guitarists